Matt Grinter  is a British writer and director working in both theatre and film. Grinter won the 2016 Papatango New Writing Prize for his play Orca.

Early life 
Grinter trained at The Arts Institute on Film Directing BA and then went on to get his Drama Directing MA at the Bristol Old Vic Theatre School.
He was one of the 2015/2016 Open Session Writers on attachment at the Bristol Old Vic.

Matt Grinter is also the artistic director of Red Rope Theatre, a Bristol based company, which he formed in 2012 with actor-producer Rebecca Robson.

His work has appeared in a number of prestigious venues across Britain (including the Tate Gallery, The Royal Academy Summer Show and Glastonbury Festival) and have earned him a number of accolades including a Kodak Award, an Honourable mention at the New York Metropolitan Film Festival the Papatango New Writing Prize and winning the Lost Theatre Company’s One Act Play competition with his play Angel.

His theatre credits include A Great Undertaking in Little America (Alma Tavern, Bristol; Everyman Theatre, Cheltenham; and the White Bear Theatre, London), Eddie Kings Unforgettable Tour of the Forgotten (Tobacco Factory, Bristol) Orphans (Alma Tavern, Bristol, and Trafalgar Studios)  Through the Night (The Finborough) and Two Way Mirror (The Rondo bath, Cotswold Playhouse, Market Theatre Ledbury, The Regal Minehead, The Gate Cardiff, The Playhouse Cheltenham, The Alma Tavern).

References

Living people
Year of birth missing (living people)